Spring Creek is a  long 3rd order tributary to the Murderkill River in Kent County, Delaware.

Course
Spring Creek forms at the confluence of Hudson Branch and Pratt Branch about 2.5 miles northwest of Frederica, Delaware.  Spring Creek then flows southeast to meet the Murderkill River at Frederica, Delaware.

Watershed
Spring Creek drains  of area, receives about 44.5 in/year of precipitation, has a topographic wetness index of 576.55 and is about 8.4% forested.

See also
List of Delaware rivers

Maps

References

Rivers of Delaware
Rivers of Kent County, Delaware